Team Fortress 2 Classic is a free mod of the 2007 game Team Fortress 2, developed by Eminoma and utilizing the Source engine. Building on a 2012 leak of the game's source code, with the code itself dating back to some point in 2008, the mod features not just community-made content, but also reworked content that was cut from the original game's development, and content based on Team Fortress Classic. This includes new weapons, gamemodes, and two new teams (GRN and YLW) used in some game modes in addition to the base game's RED and BLU teams. Additions to the mod also notably include the Civilian, a scrapped character from Team Fortress 2.

Development 
Team Fortress 2 Classic was originally envisioned as an attempt to bring back and rebalance various cut weapons and other cut content from early development of Team Fortress 2, such as the Nail Gun and the various cut grenades. In addition to overhauling the gameplay, the mod also jettisons all lore following the "Meet the Team" animated shorts minus Meet the Pyro. The "Classic" part of the Team Fortress 2 Classic name was chosen as it pertained to the aforementioned original goal of the project; to re-add and balance prerelease ("classic") cut content.

Development was started in December of 2014 by users Danielmm8888 and TF2CutContent, with the initial code being uploaded in January of 2015. Early on in the life of the project, four new gamemode ideas were planned out including Deathmatch, Four-Team, VIP and Espionage. As a result of the new gamemode plans, the main focus of re-adding and balancing early cut content was shifted aside almost entirely. Deathmatch and Four-Team were the first two new modes to be worked on out of the four, with VIP receiving a bit of work, and Espionage not making it out of conceptual stages.

After Danielmm8888 and TF2CutContent both left the project around 2016, the team underwent several changes in leadership before settling in on the current developer team Eminoma, founded by Team Fortress 2 Classic development team members in 2018, inherited the project. At this point, the project's direction underwent another major change in direction and shifted towards a reimagining of the initial release of Team Fortress 2; an attempt to bring the gameplay and roles of Team Fortress 2 back to its roots. The development team has stated that there will never be hats or cosmetics in Team Fortress 2 Classic in order to keep the core principles of Team Fortress 2 intact.

A "2.0" version of the mod was announced, with all available downloads of the original version of the mod being taken down. The removal of downloads of the original version of Team Fortress 2 Classic was done to set a clean slate for the 2.0 version and to help minimize any misrepresentation of what would or would not be in the 2.0 version. The 2.0 version took 4 years to complete, and was fully released as the "Death and Taxes" update on July 4, 2020. This update's added content included new weapons, gameplay content and achievements, and curated maps, including VIP maps that centered around the Civilian.

During development of the Death and Taxes update, the Deathmatch game mode was split from Team Fortress 2 Classic, and is now developed a separate mod called Team Deathmatch Classic, helmed by a different development team, Compucolor Pictures. The Espionage gamemode, which never left conceptual stages, was eventually scrapped from Team Fortress 2 Classic altogether and is now being worked on by another development team in the mod The Espionage Project. While Team Fortress 2 Classic never fully realized the initial goal to re-add and balance prerelease cut content, several other Team Fortress 2 mods have accomplishing this goal, namely Pre-Fortress 2.

Team Fortress 2 Classic, along with Open Fortress, were temporarily removed for download on September 10, 2021, citing an arrangement with Valve. As of June 1, 2022, both mods have returned to being available for download after no response from Valve.

Reception 
Jonathan Bolding of PC Gamer called the mod "remarkably well-produced", calling its Four-Team maps the most exciting addition.

Notes

References

External links 
 

Source (game engine) mods
First-person shooters
Multiplayer video games
Windows games
Linux games